Ariane Lipski (born January 26, 1994) is a Brazilian mixed martial artist. She is a former KSW Women's Flyweight Champion and currently competes in the flyweight division of the Ultimate Fighting Championship (UFC).

Background 
Lipski was born in Curitiba, Brazil with Polish heritage. Her grandfather migrated to Brazil before the Second World War for security reasons. Lipski started training Muay Thai at a young age and became the Brazilian Muay Thai champion prior to her transition to MMA.

Mixed martial arts career

Early career 
Lipski fought most of her early MMA career primary in Brazil and Poland, notable under  Konfrontacja Sztuk Walki promotion. After winning her debut in KSW, she faced Sheila Gaff at KSW 36, where she won via knockout in the first round. She then faced Diana Belbiţă for the KSW Women's Flyweight Championship at KSW 39: Colosseum, winning the bout via armbar at the end of the first round. She defended the title against Mariana Morais on October 22, 2017 at KSW 40. She won via rear-naked choke less than a minute into the first round. In her last performance for KSW, Lipski faced Silvana Gómez Juárez on March 3, 2018 at KSW 42. She won the bout and defended the title via unanimous decision.

She was later signed by the UFC.

Ultimate Fighting Championship 
Lipski was scheduled to make her UFC debut against Maryna Moroz, replacing injured Veronica Macedo, on November 17, 2018 at UFC Fight Night 140.  In turn, Moroz pulled out due to injury on October 30 and as a result the bout was cancelled.

Her UFC debut came two months later on 19 January 2019, against Joanne Calderwood at UFC Fight Night: Cejudo vs. Dillashaw. She lost the fight by unanimous decision.

Her second fight came on 22 June 2019 at UFC Fight Night: Moicano vs. Korean Zombie. She lost the fight via unanimous decision.

On August 1, 2019 it was announced that Lipski would fight Priscila Cachoeira at UFC on ESPN+ 22. However, due to Cachoeira tested positive for a diuretic she was forced to pull out from the event. Thus her bout with Lipski was cancelled in the event and Lipski was then scheduled to fight at UFC Fight Night: Ortega vs. Korean Zombie against Veronica Macedo on December 21, 2019, but then moved to UFC Fight Night: Błachowicz vs. Jacaré on November 16, 2019. In turn, Macedo was not cleared to fight by CABMMA due to severe headaches one day before the event and she was replaced by newcomer Isabella de Padua. At the weigh-ins, de Padua weighed in at 130.5 pounds, 4.5 pounds over the flyweight non-title fight limit of 126. The bout proceeded at a catchweight. As a result of missing weight, de Padue was fined 30% of her purse, which went to her opponent Lipski. She won the fight via unanimous decision.

As the first of her new, four-fight contract Lipski was scheduled to face Luana Carolina on May 16, 2020 at UFC Fight Night 175. However, on April 9, Dana White, the president of the UFC, announced that this event was postponed to June 13, 2020. Instead the pair eventually fought on July 19, 2020 at UFC Fight Night 172. Lipski won the fight by submission  by kneebar in the first round. This win earned her a Performance of the Night award.

Lipski faced Antonina Shevchenko on November 21, 2020 at UFC 255. She lost the fight via technical knockout. Lipski confirmed she had suffered a facial fracture in the loss to Shevchenko a day later.

Lipski faced Montana De La Rosa on June 5, 2021 at UFC Fight Night: Rozenstruik vs. Sakai. She lost via TKO in the second round.

Lipski was scheduled to face Mandy Böhm, replacing Taila Santos, on September 4, 2021 at UFC Fight Night 191. However, the bout was removed from the card during the week leading up to that event as Böhm was sidelined due to illness and the bout was rescheduled to UFC Fight Night 192 on September 18, 2021. Lipski won the fight via unanimous decision after knocking Böhm down twice during the bout.

Lipski was scheduled to face JJ Aldrich on March 12, 2022 at UFC Fight Night 203. However, Lipski was removed from her match for undisclosed reasons, and she was replaced by Gillian Robertson.

Lipski was face Priscila Cachoeira on  August 6, 2022 at UFC on ESPN 40. At the weigh-ins, Lipski weighed in at 128.5 pounds, two and a half pounds over the flyweight non-title fight limit. The bout is expected to proceed at catchweight with Lipski fined 20% of her purse, which will go to Cachoeira, but they were rescheduled to UFC on ESPN 41 in a bantamweight bout after Lipski was not medically cleared. Lipski lost the fight via technical knockout.

Lipski faced JJ Aldrich on March 11, 2023 at UFC Fight Night 221. She won the fight via unanimous decision.

Championships and accomplishments

Mixed martial arts 
Ultimate Fighting Championship
Performance of the Night (One time) 
Konfrontacja Sztuk Walki
KSW Women's Flyweight Championship (one time; former)
Three successful title defenses 
MMAJunkie.com
2020 July Submission of the Month

Mixed martial arts record 

|-
|Win
|align=center|15–8
|JJ Aldrich
|Decision (unanimous)
|UFC Fight Night: Yan vs. Dvalishvili
|
|align=center|3
|align=center|5:00
|Las Vegas, Nevada, United States
|
|-
|Loss
|align=center|14–8
|Priscila Cachoeira
|TKO (punches)
|UFC on ESPN: Vera vs. Cruz
|
|align=center|1
|align=center|1:05
|San Diego, California, United States
|
|-
|Win
| style="text-align:center" | 14–7
|Mandy Böhm
|Decision (unanimous)
|UFC Fight Night: Smith vs. Spann
|
| style="text-align:center" | 3
| style="text-align:center" | 5:00
|Las Vegas, Nevada, United States
|
|-
|Loss
| style="text-align:center" | 13–7
|Montana De La Rosa
|TKO (punches)
|UFC Fight Night: Rozenstruik vs. Sakai
|
| style="text-align:center" | 2
| style="text-align:center" | 4:27
|Las Vegas, Nevada, United States
|
|-
|Loss
| style="text-align:center" | 13–6
|Antonina Shevchenko
|TKO (punches)
|UFC 255
|
| style="text-align:center" | 2
| style="text-align:center" | 4:33
|Las Vegas, Nevada, United States
|
|-
|Win
| style="text-align:center" | 13–5
|Luana Carolina
|Submission (kneebar)
|UFC Fight Night: Figueiredo vs. Benavidez 2
|
| style="text-align:center" | 1
| style="text-align:center" | 1:28
|Abu Dhabi, United Arab Emirates
|
|-
|Win
| style="text-align:center" | 12–5
|Isabela de Pádua
|Decision (unanimous)
|UFC Fight Night: Błachowicz vs. Jacaré
|
| style="text-align:center" | 3
| style="text-align:center" | 5:00
|São Paulo, Brazil
|
|-
|Loss
| style="text-align:center" | 11–5
|Molly McCann
|Decision (unanimous)
|UFC Fight Night: Moicano vs. Korean Zombie
|
| style="text-align:center" | 3
| style="text-align:center" | 5:00
|Greenville, South Carolina, United States
|
|-
|Loss
| style="text-align:center" | 11–4
|Joanne Calderwood
|Decision (unanimous)
|UFC Fight Night: Cejudo vs. Dillashaw
|
| style="text-align:center" | 3
| style="text-align:center" | 5:00
|Brooklyn, New York, United States
|
|-
|Win
| style="text-align:center" | 11–3
|Silvana Gómez Juárez
|Decision (unanimous)
|KSW 42
|
| style="text-align:center" | 5
| style="text-align:center" | 5:00
|Łódź, Poland
|
|-
|Win
| style="text-align:center" | 10–3
|Mariana Morais
|Submission (rear-naked choke)
|KSW 40
|
| style="text-align:center" | 1
| style="text-align:center" | 0:58
|Dublin, Ireland
|
|-
|Win
| style="text-align:center" | 9–3
|Diana Belbiţă
|Submission (armbar)
|KSW 39
|
| style="text-align:center" | 1
| style="text-align:center" | 4:52
|Warsaw, Poland
|
|-
|Win
| style="text-align:center" | 8–3
|Sheila Gaff
|KO (punches)
|KSW 36
|
| style="text-align:center" | 1
| style="text-align:center" | 2:09
|Lebus, Poland
|
|-
|Win
| style="text-align:center" | 7–3
|Juliana Werner
|KO (punch)
|Imortal FC 4
|
| style="text-align:center" | 2
| style="text-align:center" | 4:26
|São José da Tapera, Brazil
|
|-
|Win
| style="text-align:center" | 6–3
|Katarzyna Lubońska
|TKO (punch and body Kick)
|KSW 33
|
| style="text-align:center" | 2
| style="text-align:center" | 3:25
|Kraków, Poland
|
|-
|Win
| style="text-align:center" | 5–3
|Paula Vieira da Silva
|TKO (punches)
|Striker's House Cup 55
|
| style="text-align:center" | 1
| style="text-align:center" | 1:04
|Curitiba, Brazil
|
|-
|Win
| style="text-align:center" | 4–3
|Marta Souza
|Decision (unanimous)
|Striker's House Cup 52
|
| style="text-align:center" | 3
| style="text-align:center" | 5:00
|Curitiba, Brazil
|
|-
|Win
| style="text-align:center" | 3–3
|Geisyele Nascimento
|TKO (punches)
|Striker's House Cup 50
|
| style="text-align:center" | 1
| style="text-align:center" | 0:35
|Curitiba, Brazil
|
|-
|Loss
| style="text-align:center" | 2–3
|Isabelly Varela
|Decision (split)
|Curitiba Top Fight 9
|
| style="text-align:center" | 3
| style="text-align:center" | 5:00
|Curitiba, Brazil
|
|-
|Loss
| style="text-align:center" | 2–2
|Daiane Firmino
|TKO (punches)
|MMA Super Heroes 7
|
| style="text-align:center" | 1
| style="text-align:center" | 2:28
|São José da Tapera, Brazil
|
|-
|Win
| style="text-align:center" | 2–1
|Jaquelline Santana
|TKO (punches)
|Gladiator Combat Fight 7
|
| style="text-align:center" | 1
| style="text-align:center" | 0:20
|Curitiba, Brazil
|
|-
|Loss
| style="text-align:center" | 1–1
|Gisele Moreira
|Decision (unanimous)
|Nitrix Champion Fight 21
|
| style="text-align:center" | 1
| style="text-align:center" | 0:20
|São José da Tapera, Brazil
|
|-
|Win
| style="text-align:center" | 1–0
|Daiana Torquato
|Decision (unanimous)
|Nitrix Champion Fight 17
|
| style="text-align:center" | 3
| style="text-align:center" | 5:00
|Balneário Camboriú, Brazil
|
|-

See also 
 List of current UFC fighters
 List of female mixed martial artists

References

External links 
 
 

1994 births
Living people
Brazilian female mixed martial artists
Flyweight mixed martial artists
Mixed martial artists utilizing Muay Thai
Mixed martial artists utilizing Brazilian jiu-jitsu
Ultimate Fighting Championship female fighters
Brazilian Muay Thai practitioners
Female Muay Thai practitioners
Brazilian practitioners of Brazilian jiu-jitsu
Female Brazilian jiu-jitsu practitioners
Sportspeople from Curitiba
Brazilian people of Polish descent